This is the complete list of Team Long Track World Championship medalists from 2007 to 2011.

Medalists

See also
 Long track motorcycle racing
 List of Speedway World Cup medalists

!
Team Long Track World Championship